Occhieppo Inferiore is a comune (municipality) in the Province of Biella in the Italian region Piedmont, located about  northeast of Turin.

Occhieppo Inferiore borders the following municipalities: Biella, Camburzano, Mongrando, Occhieppo Superiore, Ponderano.

References

External links
 Official website

Cities and towns in Piedmont